Antonio Catalano, also called Catalani or  il Siciliano, (1560–1630) was an Italian painter of the late-Renaissance and early-Baroque periods.

Biography
He was born in Messina, Sicily, where he probably received some training from his father Antonio Catalano the Elder, also a painter, or one of the brothers, Francesco or Giovanni Simone Comande. Both the elder Catalano and the Comandè brothers were pupils of Diodato Guinaccia in Messina. He is thought to have studied in Rome, and strongly influenced by Federico Barocci. He painted a Nativity for the church of the Capuchins at Gesso, near Messina.

Sources

1560 births
1630 deaths
Painters from Messina
16th-century Italian painters
Italian male painters
17th-century Italian painters
Renaissance painters